The Cathedral of Our Lady Saint Anne, is a neo-Gothic cathedral located in Santa Ana, El Salvador.

History 
The place where today is the Cathedral of Santa Ana was the central parish, which was built between 1575 and 1576, being destroyed by lightning in the 19th century. When the Diocese of Santa Ana was created preparations were made to rebuild the central parish of the city; this reconstruction was authorized in 1904 and began on January 21 of 1906. It was consecrated on February 11 of 1913.

The construction, however, continued in the decades that followed until they were finally completed on February 24 of 1959, when the marble altar of the image of Saint Anne was consecrated and finished. On April 22 of 1995 was declared a National Monument. To this day this church is still open to the public.

Design 
The building was designed as a Neo-Gothic cathedral, in contrast to the Spanish colonial style of most of the cathedrals in El Salvador and the rest of Latin America. It is formed by three naves, which are of the following measures: the central nave with 22 meters in length and 22 meters in width, the lateral naves measure 2 meters in length and eight meters in width; together the three naves form a cross.
 
The north tower offers three bells that are activated manually, while the south tower contains three bells that were brought from the Netherlands in 1949 and activated electronically. On the other hand, the Cathedral of Santa Ana has altogether 28 images or statues, 4 confessionals, 118 benches and 51 lamps.

See also

References

 Catedral de Santa Ana 

Roman Catholic cathedrals in El Salvador
Gothic Revival church buildings in El Salvador
Roman Catholic churches completed in 1913
Roman Catholic churches completed in 1959
Santa Ana, El Salvador
20th-century Roman Catholic church buildings